Laxer is a surname. Notable people with the surname include: 

James Laxer, Canadian political economist, professor and author
Michael Laxer, Canadian shopkeeper and political activist
Robert Laxer, Canadian psychologist, professor, author, and political activist

See also
Lacrosse player